Samir Bhamra is a multi-faceted British artist, playwright, costume designer, producer and musical theatre director at Phizzical Productions. Samir graduated from Loughborough University with a BSc. in Mathematics and Computation where he honed in on his creativity. His contribution to the arts and cultural landscape in the UK saw him enter the Top 5 Asian Power Couples in 2020. Influenced by Indian cinema, mythologies and classic British literature, his works across multiple art forms and digital technologies. He is also the Creative Director of the world's longest running South Asian Film Festival called UK Asian Film Festival which platforms and makes independent South Asian films and talent accessible to communities across the UK. He pioneered BollyIdol, a national talent search with BBC. His writing and directing credits include Bombay Superstar, Stardust, Bring on the Bollywood, Precious Bazaar and an academically acclaimed production of William Shakespeare's Cymbeline. He was the 2021 Senior Producer at Belgrade Theatre Coventry producing the theatre's UK City of Culture 2021 programme.

Film and festivals 
He is the Creative Director  of UK Asian Film Festival, which was previously called the London Asian Film Festival and is organised by Tongues on Fire. As part of the 17th London Asian Film Festival, he invited Tony award nominee choreographer and Bollywood film director Farah Khan to run master classes in Choreography at Southbank Centre and Directing at School of Asian and Oriental Studies.

In 2018, the festival started to tour UK wide and rebranded to become the UK Asian Film Festival. The festival marked the centenary of the Suffragette Movement, celebrating the achievements of the forgotten Indian Suffragette, Sophia Duleep Singh. Indian actress and chat show queen Simi Garewal, Pakistani actress and L'Oreal Ambassador Mahira Khan and British actress Amy Jackson who is conquering Hollywood and Bollywood were amongst the Special Guests.

The 2019 festival was themed Revolution with the opening film Hamid and closing film Pinky Memsaab. He brought legendary actors like Zeenat Aman, Shabana Azmi, Kiran Juneja and Radhika Apte to the UK. The iconic Sholay director Ramesh Sippy received a lifetime achievement award for completing 50 years in the Indian film industry.

The 2020 festival was cancelled due to the COVID-19 pandemic. The programme included the opening film Dolly Kitty Aur Woh Chamakte Sitare by the acclaimed director Alankrita Srivastava. The closing film was Zindagi Tamasha by the legendary Sarmad Khoosat.

Musicals 
In 2022, Bhamra wrote, designed and produced his dream production Bombay Superstar  co-produced with the Belgrade Theatre Coventry  and The New Wolsey Theatre in Ipswich with musical director Hinal Pattani and musicians The 515 Crew. The cast included Nisha Aaliya, Pia Sutaria, Sheetal Pandya, Amar, Chirag Rao, Yanick Ghanty, Robby Khela, Rav Moore, Daisy Hardy, Alexandra Adams, Aaron Mistry and Pavan Maru.

In 2019, he directed Stardust at Belgrade Theatre in Coventry based on songs by Robby Khela, composed by Devesh Sodha with a book co-written with hard-of-hearing writer Shahid Iqbal Khan. Stardust is a finalist for the 2020 Asian Media Awards Best Stage Production award. Samir worked with actor, singer and songwriter Robby Khela in Bring on the Bollywood, Cymbeline and previously Jean Genet's The Maids.

In 2016, he created a new musical, Bring on the Bollywood in association with Belgrade Theatre in Coventry.  Bring on the Bollywood ran for 70 performances as it toured to 12 cities in 2017. It was a finalist for Best Stage Production at Asian Media Awards 2016, Best Home Production by What's On Live in 2016 as voted by the readers of What's On Midlands and three actors from this entertaining musical were the only finalists for the Best New Talent Award at Asian Media Awards in 2017. Reviewer Roderic Dunnett described it as ''Phizzical easily justifies its name: it fizzes and whizzes, sizzles and bristles and teases with comedy, makes you want to laugh and sing, and tickles you with a storyline that could be a cousin of The Comedy of Errors or Twelfth Night".

His first musical was Precious Bazaar which opened in 2004 at The Y in Leicester. It launched the careers of actor Jas Binag and Bhopal: A Prayer of Rain actress Fagun Thakrar. They were among 10 talented actors and dancers who were discovered through the BollyIdol contest he developed with BBC and B4U. EastEnders actress Rakhee Thakrar played the lead role Suhani in Precious Bazaar. Precious Bazaar was nominated for a Windrush Award in 2004.

Theatre 
Samir's interest in Shakespeare stems from finding how he can make the story and themes relevant to an audience who may not understand the text. During the World Shakespeare Festival, he was seconded to the Royal Shakespeare Company from the National Theatre programme Step Change. His Bollywood styled production of Cymbeline toured for 12 weeks to 22 venues in England, Wales and Northern Ireland. It is considered the longest theatrical tour by any British Asian theatre company. The production was reviewed several times during its tour and received many positive reviews and is of academic interest. His thoughts about making Cymbeline feature in a new book Eating Shakespeare by academic Varsha Panjwani.

He has directed an adaptation of Layla and Majnun and Romeo and Juliet in 2006 titled Romeo + Laila written by UK based actor and playwright Omar Khan. He produced Omar Khan's adaptation of Twelfth Night titled What You Fancy which was directed by Leylah. In 2008, Samir directed the 1994 Pulitzer Prize nominated play A Perfect Ganesh written by Terrence McNally. He developed the ideas behind the play as part of in Residence at Haymarket Theatre.

Samir is currently researching and developing a production of William Shakespeare's The Winter's Tale set in Kashmir.

Dance 
Samir was the first judge of the UK version of Boogie Woogie and set the judging format which was followed from 2004 to 2008. He was a guest judge in the preliminary stages of Just Dance with Hrithik Roshan. Bhamra has been judging Just Bollywood, a Bollywood dance competition organised by Imperial University for students from all UK wide universities since 2015. He is a mentor to young adults to nurture their personal best.

He wrote and produced the first UK theatre dance adaptation of the classic story Umrao Jaan Ada written by Mirza Hadi Ruswa in December 2014.

Samir produced Subhash Viman's triple bill contemporary dance work Gamechanger, featuring Morphed, Fly From and Three. In 2018, he produced BBC Young Dancer finalist Anaya Vasudha's EKA which premiered at The Place.

Visual and Digital Arts 
His collaboration with Hitesh Rao and Ben-Azeera Lela for singer and songwriter Navin Kundra led to a new brand identity for the singer. He provided art direction and design in the digital visuals that feature in John Gihair's book Welcome to Earth.

Cultural Strategy 
Samir was one of many cultural leaders who developed a new cultural strategy for the City of Leicester.

Awards 
Samir Bhamra was awarded the Olwen Wymark award from the Writers Guild of Great Britain in 2021. He won several global awards for costume design and directing his first short musical film Mad About The Boy, screened in Shanghai, Manila, Toronto, Cannes, and at the Queen Palm International Film Festival in California.  He won the Arts and Culture Awareness award for his extensive work at the 2016 British Indian Awards in association with BDO.
Precious Bazaar was nominated for a Windrush Arts Award in 2004.
Samir received two High Commendations at the 2003 and 2004 Windrush Awards for his pioneering work in Digital, Internet and Technology.

Personal life 
His parents were of different religious backgrounds. He uses his mixed faith up-bringing to influence his artistic work.

In 2014, Samir raised funds for Macmillan Cancer in memory of his mother and grandmother by shaving his hair. In 2020, he raised funds for Mental Health Awareness.

References

External links 
 

Living people
Hindi cinema
1975 births
British writers of Indian descent
Kenyan emigrants to the United Kingdom
English theatre directors
Indian theatre directors
English dramatists and playwrights
Kenyan people of Indian descent
English people of Indian descent
People from Leicester
Alumni of Loughborough University